DHK may refer to:

 DHK Latgale
 Dihydrokainic acid
 Drammen HK